is a railway station in the town of Koori, Fukushima,  Japan operated by East Japan Railway Company (JR East).

Lines
Koori Station is served by the Tōhoku Main Line, and is located 285.9 rail kilometers from the official starting point of the line at Tokyo Station.

Station layout
The station has one side platform and one island platform connected to the station building by a footbridge, but only the side platform and one side of the island platform is in use. The station is staffed.

Platforms

History
Koori Station opened on December 15, 1887. The station was absorbed into the JR East network upon the privatization of the Japanese National Railways (JNR) on April 1, 1987.

Passenger statistics
In fiscal 2018, the station was used by an average of 631 passengers daily (boarding passengers only).

Surrounding area
Koori Post Office
Koori town hall

See also
 List of Railway Stations in Japan

References

External links
 
  

Stations of East Japan Railway Company
Railway stations in Fukushima Prefecture
Tōhoku Main Line
Railway stations in Japan opened in 1887
Koori, Fukushima